Champions Bowl III was the third title game of Champions Indoor Football (CIF). It was played on June 23, 2017, and won by the Texas Revolution.

Road to the Champions Bowl
The four teams (ordered by seeding) that made the postseason in the North Conference were the Sioux City Bandits, Omaha Beef, Bloomington Edge, and Bismarck Bucks. In the South Conference, the playoff teams were the Amarillo Venom, Texas Revolution, Dodge City Law, and Duke City Gladiators. The Gladiators appeared in their first playoffs as a franchise, while the Beef made their first CIF playoff appearance. The Beef last played in the playoffs in 2013 while a member of the Champions Professional Indoor Football League. The Law had actually won nine games and would have finished second in the division but were issued two-win penalty by the league towards the end of the regular season for breaking league rules.

On Saturday, June 10, the Bandits and the Venom pulled easy wins over the Bucks and the Gladiators, winning 82–43 and 70–41 respectively. That same night, the Beef defeated the Edge 43–30, and the Law continued their playoff losing streak with a close 63–59 loss against the "Revs".

In the North Conference championship, the Beef upset the Bandits 55–45, thanks to a late touchdown with 11 seconds remaining in the game. Two days later, in the South Conference championship, the Revolution advanced to their second Champions Bowl with a 77–71 win over the Venom, their third win over the team in the 2017 season.

Playoffs

Matchups

References

2017 Champions Indoor Football season
Champions Bowl
Omaha Beef
Texas Revolution (indoor football)
2017 in sports in Texas
Sports competitions in Texas
June 2017 sports events in the United States